Greatest Hits 1994–2004 is the first compilation album by Canadian country music artist Terri Clark. It was released July 27, 2004 on Mercury Records. The album chronicles her highest-charting singles in the U.S., starting with her 1995 debut "Better Things to Do" and going through "I Wanna Do it All", the last single from her previous album, 2003's Pain to Kill.

Also included on this compilation are two new tracks, "Girls Lie Too" and "One of the Guys", as well as a live rendition of her 2000 single "No Fear". "Girls Lie Too" was released as a single, becoming a number one hit on the country charts in September 2004. After that single, Clark released the #26-peaking "The World Needs a Drink", which was not included on an album. It was certified Gold by the RIAA in December 2004.

Track listing

Personnel on tracks 12 and 13
 Mike Brignardello – bass guitar
 Terri Clark – lead vocals, background vocals
 Stuart Duncan – fiddle
 Paul Franklin – steel guitar
 Sonny Garrish – steel guitar
 Wes Hightower – background vocals
 B. James Lowry – acoustic guitar
 Brent Mason – electric guitar
 Steve Nathan – keyboards
 Gary Prim – piano
 Lonnie Wilson – drums
 Glenn Worf – bass guitar

Charts

Weekly charts

Year-end charts

References

Terri Clark albums
2004 greatest hits albums
Mercury Records compilation albums